Neal Beaumont (born 1941) is a former award winning and Grey Cup champion defensive back and punter who played in the Canadian Football League for the BC Lions from 1960 to 1967.

A native of Vancouver, Beaumont earned a starting defensive halfback position with the Lions when he was 19 in 1960 and, along with 53 punt returns for 226 yards, was the winner of the Dr. Beattie Martin Trophy for Canadian rookie of the year in the west. This was the first time a BC Lion had won an individual CFL player award. He would go on to play 8 seasons, intercepting 22 passes and becoming the team's leading punter(both punts and yards,) He punted 624 times for 25,607 yards. He also has the longest interception return in CFL history, 120 yards for a touchdown, against the Saskatchewan Roughriders on October 12, 1963.

His best season was 1964, when he intercepted 5 passes, was a Western All-Star Defensive Halfback, had the best punting average in the Western Conference, 42.1 on 90 punts, led the team in kickoff returns with 19 and also returned 51 punts and added a final interception in the Lions first ever Grey Cup victory.
"The nickname CRUSHER derives from Beaumont's cannibalistic tackling tendencies, which we try not to discourage" -  
In total he played 123 regular season games for the Lions. He was elected to the BC Lions Wall of Fame in 2003.

References

1941 births
Living people
BC Lions players
Canadian Football League Rookie of the Year Award winners
Players of Canadian football from British Columbia
Canadian football people from Vancouver